Heliobolus spekii, also known commonly as Speke's sand lizard, is a species of lizard in the family Lacertidae. The species is native to East Africa and the Horn of Africa. There are three recognized subspecies.

Etymology
The specific name, spekii, is in honor of British explorer John Hanning Speke.

Geographic range
H. spekii is found in Somalia, Ethiopia, South Sudan, Kenya, Uganda, and Tanzania.

Reproduction
H. spekii is oviparous.

Subspecies
Three subspecies are recognized as being valid, including the nominotypical subspecies.
Heliobolus spekii scorteccii 
Heliobolus spekii sextaeniata 
Heliobolus spekii spekii 

Nota bene: A trinomial authority in parentheses indicates that the subspecies was originally described in a genus other than Heliobolus.

References

Further reading
Arillo A, Balletto E, Spanò S (1965). "II e III spedizione Scortecci in Migiurtinia: il genere Eremias Wiegmann (Reptilia, Lacertidae)". Bollettino dei Musei e degli Istituti Biologici della Università di Genova 33: 85–109. (Eremias spekii scorteccii, new subspecies). (in Italian).
Goldberg SR (2009). "Reproduction in Speke's Sand Lizard, Heliobolus spekii (Squamata: Lacertidae) from Kenya". African Herp News (48): 2–4.
Günther A (1872). "Description of three new Species of Eremias ". Annals and Magazine of Natural History, Fourth Series 9: 381–382. (Eremias spekii, new species, p. 381).
Spawls S, Howell K, Hinkel H, Menegon M (2018). Field Guide to East African Reptiles, Second Edition. London: Bloomsbury Natural History. 624 pp. . (Heliobolus spekii, p. 199).
Stejneger L (1893). "On some collections of reptiles and batrachians from East Africa and the adjacent islands, recently received from Dr. W. L. Abbott and Mr. William Astor Chanler, with descriptions of new species". Proceedings of the United States National Museum 16: 711–741. (Eremias sextæniata, new species, pp. 718–719).

Heliobolus
Lacertid lizards of Africa
Reptiles of Ethiopia
Reptiles of Kenya
Reptiles of Somalia
Reptiles of South Sudan
Reptiles of Tanzania
Reptiles of Uganda
Reptiles described in 1872
Taxa named by Albert Günther